A list of films produced by the Marathi language film industry based in Maharashtra in the year 1938.

1938 Releases
A list of Marathi films released in 1938.

References

External links
Gomolo - 

Lists of 1938 films by country or language
1938
1938 in Indian cinema